MIAA may refer to:
 Maine Intercollegiate Athletic Association, defunct athletic conference of schools in Maine
 Manila International Airport Authority, transportation agency in the Philippines
 Maryland Interscholastic Athletic Association, high school athletic conference for private schools in the Baltimore Metro area
 Massachusetts Interscholastic Athletic Association, high school athletic association governing 33 varsity sports throughout Massachusetts
 Michigan Intercollegiate Athletic Association, athletic conference of NCAA Division III schools in Michigan and Indiana
 Mid-America Intercollegiate Athletics Association, athletic conference of NCAA Division II schools in Kansas, Missouri, Nebraska, and Oklahoma
 TRNA dimethylallyltransferase, an enzyme